Aula Maxima, officially the McMahon Hall, is a theatre building in Maynooth, County Kildare, Ireland. It was built in 1893.

Aula Maxima comes from Latin, meaning Great Hall. The building is also known simply as "The Aula". It is situated on the South Campus of Maynooth University and St Patrick's College, Maynooth and is the main theatre for the university, college and surrounding area. It also serves as the conferring hall of the university where the annual graduations take place. The Aula was also used as a Cinema for the students in the college, with the Maynooth Students' Union screening films there.

History
Right Rev. Mgr. McMahon of the Catholic University of America in Washington, DC originally gifted the theatre to St Patrick's College, his alma mater, and its construction was completed under the presidency of Bishop Robert Browne.

Aula Maxima houses a projection box, which was in regular use for 40 years.

Dramatic performances
Maynooth University's Drama Society (also known as The Roscian Players) is the resident company of Aula Maxima. A wide variety of their productions staged therein. The venue has also hosted performances by St Patrick's College's dramatic society, Maynooth University Chamber Orchestra and Maynooth Community Players:

Folklore
There are numerous stories relating to the reputed presence of a ghost in Aula Maxima. Simply known as the Aula Ghost, he is reputed to be the spirit of a projectionist, active in Maynooth in the 1940s. The projectionist was a seminarian and member of St Patrick's College who fell to his death from the projectionist's box in Aula Maxima.
A number of superstitions exist regarding treatment of Aula Maxima and the Aula Ghost. One such superstition centres on the ghost's apparent turning of a chair placed over the projection box to face away from the stage if he does not like a performance, or the manner in which the staging of the performance was conducted.

See also
 Irish theatre
 List of Irish theatres and theatre companies

References

Theatres completed in 1893
Buildings and structures in County Kildare
Maynooth
St Patrick's College, Maynooth
Maynooth University
Theatres in the Republic of Ireland
19th-century architecture in the Republic of Ireland